Augusto Arbizo (born 1972 in Quezon City, Philippines) is a visual artist, gallerist, art advisor, and art curator. Arbizo lives and works in New York City. Arbizo studied at The School of the Art Institute of Chicago and graduated from The Cooper Union School of Art, NY, where he received a Bachelor of Arts in painting; he earned a Masters of Fine Arts degree from the University of Michigan. His solo exhibitions include White Columns, NY; Envoy, NY; Sandra Gering Gallery, NY; Michael Steinberg Fine Art, NY; and Roebling Hall Gallery, NY. Group exhibitions include Artists Space, NY and The Queens Museum of Art, NY. As a curator, he has organized exhibitions for Greenberg Van Doren Gallery, NY, White Columns, NY, and John Connelly Presents, NY among others. He was the director of 11R Eleven Rivington, NY (2007–2017), which merged with Van Doren Waxter; Arbizo was a gallery partner at Van Doren Waxter (2017–2021). Arbizo joined the New York art advisory firm Schwartzman& in 2021.

See also
Arts of the Philippines

References

1972 births
Living people
Filipino artists
People from Quezon City
Artists from Metro Manila
Cooper Union alumni
University of Michigan College of Literature, Science, and the Arts alumni